Renaud or Ragenold, Count of Roucy ( 920 – 10 May 967) was a 10th-century Viking who swore allegiance to the Frankish kings, and became the military chief of Reims after the restoration of the Archbishop Artald of Reims, upon taking the area back from Hugh of Vermandois. 

Renaud was made the Count of Roucy around or before 955 by King Lothair.

He married Alberade of Lorraine, daughter of Gilbert, Duke of Lorraine around 945 and had four children:
 Ermentrude (married, firstly, to Aubry II of Mâcon; secondly, to Otto-William, Count of Burgundy)
 Giselbert (Gilbert of Roucy) who succeeded his father as Count of Roucy in May 967.
 Unknown daughter who may have married to Fromond II of Sens.
 Brunon de Roucy, the Bishop of Langres.

Renaud could have had a brother named Dodo according to Flodoard. Their parents are not known or recorded.

Renaud died on 10 May 967 and was buried at the Abbey of Saint-Remi.

References

External links
 

920 births
967 deaths
Year of birth uncertain
Counts of Roucy
Viking rulers
Burials at the Royal Abbey of Saint-Remi
10th-century Vikings